Stryx is an Italian TV series, aired in 1978 on Rai 2.

Description 

Stryx thematically referred to Hell, devils and underworld. The scenography featured elements resembling Middle Ages-like gloomy castles and caves.

The show featured acting as well as musical performances from such artists as Amanda Lear, Asha Puthli, Grace Jones or Patty Pravo. The musical part was divided into a number of smaller parts, with each part featuring a performance from one specific artist, for example Asha Puthli in "Indian Stryx", Amanda Lear in Sexy Stryx or Grace Jones in Rumstryx. The show was produced in the disco era, therefore this genre dominates the musical background of Stryx.

The show caused many controversies in more conservative societies, mainly because of its devilish theme and referring to underworld as well as exposing nudity. Due to numerous protests the show was taken off the broadcast and the production of following episodes was cancelled. Apart from six known episodes there exists also the seventh one, which has never been officially aired on television.

Personnel

Cast 

 Amanda Lear - Sexy Stryx
 Anna Oxa - Stereo Stryx
 Asha Puthli- Indian Stryx
 Corrado Lojacono
 Gal Costa - Stryx do Brasil
 Gianni Cajfa
 Grace Jones - Rumstryx
 Hal Yamanduchi
 Mia Martini - Gipsy Stryx
 Luis Agudo
 Ombretta Colli - Ludmilla
 Patty Pravo - Subliminal Stryx
 Tony Renis - Piloconduttore
 Walter Valdi

Production 

 Enzo Trapani - director
 Ennio di Majo - script
 Gianna Sgarbossa - costumes
 Tony De Vita - music
 Renato Greco - choreography
 Enzo Torroni - light

Italian fantasy television series
Musical television series
1978 Italian television series debuts
1970s Italian television series
1978 in Italian television